Marmaris Belediye GSK is a Turkish sports club based in Marmaris, Muğla. The team's name mostly referred incorrectly as Marmaris Belediyespor due to the common usage about names of football teams in Turkey.

References

 
Sport in Marmaris
Football clubs in Turkey
Association football clubs established in 1931
1931 establishments in Turkey